Leibovitz is a surname, and may refer to:

 Annie Leibovitz (born 1949), American portrait photographer
 Dan Leibovitz (born 1973), American basketball coach
 Liel Leibovitz (born 1976), Israeli journalist
 Lynn Leibovitz (born 1959), American judge
 Tahl Leibovitz (born 1975), American para table tennis player

See also
 Leibovitz v. Paramount Pictures Corp., a 1998 US copyright fair use case
 Leibowitz
 Liebowitz
 Lebowitz

Jewish surnames